Farma ("The Farm") is a Croatian reality TV series broadcast on Nova TV which debuted in 2008.  The show is completely produced and broadcast in HDTV, and was the first HD program in Croatia.

The show is set in the natural surroundings of a farm.  During its first two seasons, it was broadcast for 13 weeks, six days in a week, in prime time, and was the highest rated show of the season.  The winner of the first season was singer Rafael Dropulić also known as Rafo.  The winner of the second season was actor Mario Mlinarić, and the winner of the third was Kristijan Kiki Rahimovski.. The fourth revamped season was won by Blaženka Slamar, the first female winner in four seasons and the first winner that got eliminated at one point of the game missing three weeks at the Farm. The fifth season is currently airing.

Season 1 

The first season of the show premiered on 9 March 2008, and concluded on 6 June 2008. Mia Kovačić served as the main host, Davor Dretar Drele served as the co-host, while Josip "Joža" Tučkorić mentored the contestants. Rafael Dropulić was crowned as the winner and won 500,000 Kn.

Contestants

Voting history

Notes

Season 2 

The winner of the second season was Mario Mlinarić who won 324,000 kuna from the prize.

Contestants

Voting history

Season 3 
The third season of show started on March 21, 2010 and finished on June 18, 2010 (90 days). Nikolina Pišek and Mia Kovačić served as hosts & Davor Dretar Drele returned after a one-season break as a co-host. The winner Kiki Rahimovski received 269.000 kuna from the prize.

Contestants

Voting history

Season 4: Novi početak

The fourth season, entitled Farma: Novi Početak (New Start) premiered 6 September 2015. It's the first season since 2010 and it's the first season to not feature celebrities nor to air in spring. Mia Kovačić returnes as host and Josip Tučkorić - Joža returnes as mentor. Davor Dretar - Drele, former co-host, is replaced by Dušan Bučan. This is also the first season to not feature the studio reportings and live duels.

After 103 days Blaženka Slamar was crowned as the winner and won 425,000kn.

Contestants

Voting history

Notes

Season 5: Dvije Farme 

It premiered on the September 4, 2016 and features 18 new farmers. Mia Kovačić and Dušan Bućan returne as hosts, while Josip Tučkorić - Joža returnes as mentor. The format will be similar to Season 4 with a few twists.

18 farmers will be divided into 2 teams of 9 on different farms (Team Modern Farm vs. Team Old Farm). Each Farm will have its own Head of Farm and servants (who will be chosen by the whole house instead of the Head of Farm only) and they will compete for team immunity. The winning team is safe from the Duel.

The Duels will feature 3 cycles. In the first one, the first duelist will be chosen by the losing team and the first duelist chooses his opponent from his team. The difference in the second cycle is that the first duelist can choose his opponent from the winning team too. In the third and final cycle teams merge into one farm.

Contestants

Mini Duels
A brand new feature this season is the Mini Duels. In each one two farmers from the winning team compete for a reward of their own choice.

Voting history
 Color key
 – Team Red 
 – Team Green

Notes

Season 6 
The season was filmed in 2017, however it premiered on September 15, 2018 and features 18 new farmers. Mia Kovačić remained as the main host and Josip Tučkorić - Joža remained as mentor. Davor Dretar returnes to the show replacing Dušan Bučan as co-host. This season has a few changes, such as the winner of the duel is immune for the next week.

Contestants

Voting history

References

External links
http://farma.novatv.hr

Television series by Endemol
The Farm (franchise)
2008 Croatian television series debuts
2010 Croatian television series endings
Croatian reality television series
Nova TV (Croatia) original programming